Covali is the Romanian form of the name Kowal, meaning "forger" or "blacksmith" in Slavic languages.
The surname may refer to:

, Moldovan singer
Margareta Perevoznic (born 1936), née Covali, Romanian chess player 
Vasile Covali, Moldavian politician of Ukrainian descent, member of Sfatul Țării (parliament) of the  Moldavian Democratic Republic

Romanian-language surnames
East Slavic-language surnames